Garhi Phulgran is one of the 51 union councils (administrative subdivisions) of Abbottabad District in Khyber-Pakhtunkhwa province of Pakistan.

Subdivisions
The Union Council is divided into the following areas: Garhi Phulgran, Takia Sheikhan, Banda Sheikhan, Ghora Bazgram, Harnara, Kaila, Mannan, Rajoya and Thith Ochar. Until the local government reforms of 2000, Rajoya was a separate union council.

Major villages
Rajoya
Kiala
Banda Sheikhan
Ghari Phulgran (state of khan)
Takia Sheikhan
Ghora Baz Garan
Malkan
Batala
Hurnara
Sajawal
Upper Sajawal

References

Union councils of Abbottabad District

fr:Ghari Phulgran
 
Facebook page:GHARI Phulgran Update